Cow's trotters are the feet of cattle. The cuts are used in various dishes around the world, especially in Asian, African, French, and the Caribbean cuisine. Latin American cuisine also uses cow's trotters for several traditional dishes. 

Other than cattle, the trotters of other ungulates such as goat, sheep and pig might also be consumed and used in certain dish of some cuisines' tradition.

Description

The cow's trotters does not contain any muscles or meat; other than bones and toe hoof, it mainly consists of skin, tendons and cartilage. In cuisine, the trotters' cuts are mainly valued for its unique texture—a gelatinous rather chewy soft texture of its tendons and skin, and also a rich broth produced from its bones. Nevertheless, to acquire a pleasant soft texture, a prolonged time of cooking, or pressure cooker might be employed in the process, this will extract the gelatins out of the trotters into the soup. 

Traditionally, in Western cuisine, the trotters are not commonly consumed, and not included in common cut of beef, which only recognize shanks. Nevertheless, the cut is often included as part of beef shank. 

In Indonesian cuisine, cow's trotters is considered as a delicacy. The gulai tunjang or gulai kaki sapi is a popular spicy cow's trotter curry in Padang cuisine. While soto kaki sapi is a type of traditional spicy Soto soup made of bits of tendons, cartilage and skin from cow's trotters. The soup is popular in Indonesia, especially in Betawi cuisine.

Dishes

 Cow foot stew in Jamaica
 El Hergma/Hargma (الهركمة) or El-Ker'ine/Ker3ine (الكرعين) in Morocco. A traditional dish of cow's, calves' or lamb's trotters/feet with a base of chickpeas and a spicy (watery) sauce.
 Fattah kawara (فتة كوارع)  in Egypt.
 Gulai tunjang, spicy cow's trotters curry in Minangkabau cuisine in Indonesia
 Kare-kare in the Philippines can use cow's trotters  
 Khash in Armenia, Azerbaijan and Iran, also known as pacha in Iraq and Turkey
 Makongoro in Tanzania
 Mangqina/Mazondo in Zimbabwe
 Mão de vaca, in the traditional cuisine of Cabo Verde, is a cow trotter soup made using pureed chickpeas. It is commonly eaten in the early morning hours, often directly after leaving the discotech. Cabo Verdeans frequently attest that consuming mão de vaca increases sexual stamina and prowess. 
 Mie kocok, an Indonesian beef noodle soup, which contains rich beef consommé soup, beef tendon or slices of cow's trotters, bean sprouts and meatball.
 Nkwobi in Nigeria
 Paya in Pakistan
 Sagol in Korean cuisine
 Soto mie Bogor noodle soup uses slices of cow's trotters from Indonesia.
 Soto kaki sapi, spicy cow's trotters soup in Indonesian cuisine
 Thlakwana in South Africa.
 Yam tin khwai in Thai cuisine, a spicy and sour Northern Thai soup made with the hoof of a water buffalo.

See also
Chicken feet
Claws
Offal
Pig's trotters
Sheep's trotters

References

External links

 What to cook with Cow Trotters. - LeGourmetTV 

Cuts of beef
Foot